The 2008 European Mixed Curling Championship was held from September 22 to 27, 2008 at the Mercedes Benz Sportpark in Kitzbühel, Austria.

Germany, skipped by Rainer Schöpp won its first title, defeating Czech Republic in the final.

Teams
The teams are as follows:

Round Robin
In every group: first place directly to playoffs, second place to qualification round

Group A

 Team to playoffs
 Teams to tie-break for 2nd place

Tie-break

Group B

 Team to playoffs
 Teams to qualification round

Group C

 Team to playoffs
 Teams to qualification round

Qualification round

Qualification semifinal

Qualification final

Playoffs

Semifinals

Bronze medal game

Final

Final standings

References

 
2008 in curling
2008 in Austrian sport
Sport in Tyrol (state)
European Mixed Curling Championship
International curling competitions hosted by Austria
September 2008 sports events in Europe
Kitzbühel